Clifton Hills Landing Strip (IATA:CFH, ICAO:YCFH) also known as Clifton Hills Airport, is a landing strip in Clifton Hills Station, South Australia.

Facilities 
The airport has 2 runways.

 Runway 1: This is the main runway with a length of 2952 ft (900 m), has a surface material of dirt and an approximate heading of 03/21.
 Runway 2: The runway's length is 2624 ft (800 m), also has a surface material of dirt, and an approximate heading of 11/29.

See also
List of airports in South Australia

References 

Airports in South Australia
Far North (South Australia)